Australia (also Australia Landing) is a former town located in Bolivar County, Mississippi, United States.  Australia was located on the Mississippi River.

History
Andrew Jackson Donelson, a planter, purchased  of land at Australia in 1857.

Australia had a post office from 1858 to 1908.

The population was 38 in 1900.

The "Cessions Towhead Chute", a cutoff constructed on the Mississippi River, left Australia situated on a narrow channel no longer used for navigation.

Nothing remains of the settlement.

References

Former populated places in Bolivar County, Mississippi
Mississippi populated places on the Mississippi River
Former populated places in Mississippi
1858 establishments in Mississippi